The 2011 McGrath Cup  is a Gaelic football competition played by the teams of Munster GAA. The competition differs from the Munster Senior Football Championship as it also features further education colleges and the winning team does not progress to another tournament at All-Ireland level. Kerry retained the trophy after a 0-13 to 1-7 win against Clare at Dr Crokes grounds, Killarney, on 29 January.

McGrath Cup

Preliminary round

Quarter-finals

Semi-finals

Final

See also
 2011 Dr McKenna Cup

References

McGrath Cup
McGrath Cup